Cladorhiza evae is a species of carnivorous sponge native to hydrothermal vents in the Gulf of California.

References

Animals described in 2014
Cladorhiza